Histatins are histidine-rich (cationic) antimicrobial proteins found in saliva. Histatin's involvement in antimicrobial activities makes histatin part of the innate immune system.

Histatin was first discovered (isolated) in 1988, with functions that's responsible in keeping homeostasis inside the oral cavity, helping in the formation of pellicles, and assist in bonding of metal ions.


Structure 
The structure of histatin is unique depending on whether the protein of interest is histatin 1, 3 or 5. Nonetheless, histatins mainly possess a cationic (positive) charge due to the primary structure consisting mostly of basic amino acids. An amino acid that is crucial to histatin's function is histidine. Studies show that the removal of histidine (especially in histatin 5) resulted in reduction of antifungal activity.

Function 
Histatins are antimicrobial and antifungal proteins, and have been found to play a role in wound-closure. A significant source of histatins is found in the serous fluid secreted by Ebner's glands, salivary glands at the back of the tongue, and produced by acinus cells. Here they offer some early defense against incoming microbes.

The three major histatins are 1, 3, and 5, which contains 38, 32, and 24 amino acids, respectively. Histatin 2 is a degradation product of histatin 1, and all other histatins are degradation products of Histatin 3 through the process of post-translational proteolysis of the HTN3 gene product. Therefore there are only two genes, HTN1 and HTN3.

The N-terminus of Histatin 5 allows it to bind with metals, and this can result in the production of reactive oxygen species.

Histatins disrupt the fungal plasma membrane, resulting in release of the intracellular content of the fungal cell. They also inhibit the growth of yeast, by binding to the potassium transporter and facilitating in the loss of azole-resistant species.

The antifungal properties of histatins have been seen with fungi such as Candida glabrata, Candida krusei, Saccharomyces cerevisiae, and Cryptococcus neoformans.

Histatins also precipitate tannins from solution, thus preventing alimentary adsorption.

References 

Membrane proteins
Antimicrobial peptides